Pagli is a Bollywood film. It was released in 1943.

Cast

Soundtrack
The music of the film was composed by Ustad Jhande Khan, Govind Ram, Amir Ali, Rasheed Attre.

References

External links
 

1943 films
1940s Hindi-language films
Films scored by Rashid Attre
Indian black-and-white films